Thomas Cajetan Kelly  (July 14, 1931 – December 14, 2011) was an American prelate of the Roman Catholic Church.  A member of the Dominican Order, Kelley served as archbishop of the Archdiocese of Louisville in Kentucky from 1982 until his retirement in 2007.  He previously served as an auxiliary bishop of the Archdiocese of Washington from 1977 to 1981.

Biography

Early life 
Thomas Kelly was born on July 14,1931, in Rochester, New York, the son of Thomas E. Kelly and Katherine Fisher.  When Kelly was a child, the family moved to New York City.  He attended Joan of Arc School in Jackson Heights and then Regis High School in Manhattan. Kelly studied for two years at Providence College in Providence, Rhode Island.  He then attended St. Rose Priory in Springfield, Kentucky, and St. Joseph Priory in Somerset, Ohio.  Kelly then entered the Dominican House of Studies in Washington, D.C.  He was admitted to the Dominican Order on August 25, 1951.

Priesthood 
Kelly was ordained to the priesthood at St. Dominic Church in Washington, D.C. on June 5, 1958.  He earned a Licentiate of Sacred Theology from the Dominican House of Studies in Washington, D.C. in 1959 and a Doctor of Canon Law degree from the Pontifical University of St. Thomas Aquinas in Rome in 1962.  He would later study at the University of Vienna in Austria and at Cambridge University in the United Kingdom.

In 1962, Kelly was appointed as secretary of the Dominican Province of St. Joseph, headquartered in New York City. During his time in New York, he also worked for the tribunal of the Archdiocese of New York and the Legion of Decency. In 1965, Kelly was appointed the secretary and archivist for the Apostolic Nunciature to the United States in Washington, D.C. After serving at the nunciature for seven years, he was appointed associate general secretary of the U.S. Conference of Catholic Bishops (USCCB) in 1972. He was elected to a five-year term as general secretary of the USCCB in March 1977.

Auxiliary Bishop of Washington 
In July 1977, Pope Paul VI named Kelly an auxiliary bishop of the Archdiocese of Washington and titular bishop of Tusuro.  He was consecrated on August 15, 1977, by then-Archbishop Joseph Bernardin at the Basilica of the National Shrine of the Immaculate Conception in Washington.

Archbishop of Louisville 
On December 21, 1981, Pope John Paul II appointed Kelly as archbishop of the Archdiocese of Louisville.  He was installed on February 18, 1982.   

Kelly led the restoration of the Cathedral of the Assumption in Louisville, pushed for interfaith dialogue, and worked for increased lay person leadership in the archdiocese.  He started a Campaign for Excellence program that reversed the enrollment decline at Catholic schools in the archdiocese. Kelly admitted to developing an opioid addiction while recovering from surgery for lung cancer, only recognizing the problem after being confronted by his doctors.

Honors 
Kelly was a recipient of the following honorary doctoral degrees: 

 Sacred Theology, Providence College
 Laws, Assumption College, Worcester, Massachusetts
 Human Sciences, Caldwell College, Caldwell, New Jersey 
 Human Letters, Spalding University, Louisville
 Humane Letters, Albertus Magnus College, New Haven, Connecticut; 
 Sacred Theology, Dominican School of Philosophy and Theology, Berkeley, California
 Theology, Aquinas Institute of Theology, St. Louis, Missouri

Retirement and death 
Pope Benedict XVI accepted Kelly's resignation as archbishop of Louisville on June 7, 2007.  Kelly died at the age of 80 on December 14, 2011, at Holy Trinity Parish, his home since retirement, in Louisville, Kentucky.

References

1931 births
2011 deaths
Religious leaders from Rochester, New York
Pontifical University of Saint Thomas Aquinas alumni
Religious leaders from Louisville, Kentucky
20th-century Roman Catholic archbishops in the United States
Roman Catholic Archdiocese of Louisville
Dominican bishops
Regis High School (New York City) alumni
Providence College alumni
Catholics from Kentucky
21st-century Roman Catholic archbishops in the United States